The people listed below were all born in, residents of, or otherwise closely associated with the city of Cleveland, Ohio.

A
Tony Abbott, author of children's books
Richard F. Abel, U.S. Air Force Brigadier General
Tony Adamle, football player
Steven Adler, original drummer of Guns N' Roses
Corey Allen, film and television director, writer, producer, and actor
RaShaun Allen, football player
Gordon Allport, psychologist
Ernie Anderson, radio and TV personality
Ray Anthony, bandleader, trumpeter, songwriter, and actor
William Appling, music educator, conductor, pianist and arranger
Graham Armstrong, football player
Daniel Arsham, visual artist
Avant, singer
Max M. Axelrod, businessman and sports pioneer
Nathaniel Ayers, musician
Albert Ayler, musician
Brian Azzarello, comic book writer

B
Catherine Bach, actress (The Dukes of Hazzard)
Jim Backus, actor (Gilligan's Island, Mister Magoo)
Benny Bailey, musician
Rodney Bailey, football player
Edward M. Baker, investment broker
Jerome Baker, Ohio State linebacker drafted by the Miami Dolphins
Newton D. Baker, mayor, Secretary of War
Bill Balas, screenwriter, director and producer
Kaye Ballard, actress
John Banaszak, football player, current coach at Robert Morris University
Robert Bardwell, former organist for the Cleveland Indians
Majel Barrett, actress
Vanessa Bayer, comedian, Saturday Night Live
William Bayer, author
Brian Michael Bendis, comic book writer
Peter Bergman, actor and comedian, Firesign Theatre 
Haley Bennett, actress
LeCharles Bentley, football player
Halle Berry, Academy Award-winning actress
Leon Bibb, TV news anchor
Charles Biederman, artist
Earl Billings, actor
David Birney, actor
Nina Blackwood, radio personality
Randy Blake, kickboxer
Hanne Blank, historian
Mark Bloch, artist
Max Bohm, artist 
Flesh-n-Bone, rapper 
Layzie Bone, rapper 
Emma Scarr Booth, writer
Lynn Borden, actress
Marvin Bower, business theorist
Earl Boykins, basketball player
Christopher A. Boyko, United States Federal Judge
Alva Bradley, Indians owner, 1927–46
Lynn Brenne, Illinois state representative
Regina Brett, author, inspirational speaker and newspaper columnist
Jim Brickman, songwriter
Dana Brooke, pro wrestler, bodybuilder, fitness competitor, model
Robert Elton Brooker, business executive
Chris Broussard, sports analyst
Jim Brown, Hall of Fame football player
Paul Brown, NFL coach
Yvette Nicole Brown, actress (Drake & Josh, Community)
Charles Brush, inventor
Christian Bryant, football player
Eliza Bryant (1827–1907), humanitarian
Henrietta Buckmaster (1909–1983), journalist and author
Jan Buckner Walker, cruciverbalist, author and games creator
Hy Buller (1926–1968), All-Star NHL ice hockey player
Isabel Burgess, Arizona state legislator
Beatrice Burton, romance writer
Steve Burton, actor
Judith Butler, philosopher

C
Anthony O. Calabrese Jr., judge
Jerrod Calhoun, basketball coach for the Youngstown State Penguins
Jane L. Campbell, mayor
Drew Carey, comedian (The Drew Carey Show, host of popular game show The Price Is Right)
Mary Carey, adult film actress
Eric Carmen, singer and musician
Wynona Carr, gospel singer
Wesley Carroll, football player
Drew Carter, football player
Janis Carter, actress
William Case, 12th mayor of Cleveland
Ray Cash, rapper
Ariel Castro, kidnapper
Andy Cannavino, football player
Richard Celeste, Ohio governor
Chris Chambers, football player
Jason Champion, singer
Tracy Chapman, singer
Tim Cheatwood, Ohio State and pro football player, Cleveland Gladiators of Arena Football League and Canadian Football League all-star
Cheetah Chrome (Eugene Richard O'Connor), punk rock guitarist for Rocket from the Tombs and The Dead Boys
Charles Chesnutt, author
Howie Chizek, radio personality
John Choma, football player
Frank Clark, football player
Gilby Clarke, musician
Bill Cobbs, actor
Henry D. Coffinberry, industrialist
Marc Cohn, musician
Carl Cohen, executive, father of Corey Allen
Davon Coleman, football player
George E. Condon, journalist, writer, and local historian
Tim Conway, comedian and actor
David Conte, composer
Rita Corrigan, All-American Girls Professional Baseball League player
Tom Cousineau, football player
James Cotton, football player
Franklin Cover, actor
Delbert Cowsette, football player
Wes Craven, film director
George Washington Crile, co-founder of the Cleveland Clinic, gave first successful blood transfusion
George Washington Crile Jr., surgeon
George Washingtion Crile III, CBS news, journalist and producer
Susan Crile, painter
Dartanyon Crockett, competitive Judo athlete
Matt Cross, professional wrestler
Francis Earl Curran, 28th mayor of San Diego, California
Harvey Cushing, neurosurgeon

D
DaBaby, rapper
Tadd Dameron, composer
Dorothy Dandridge, actress
William H. Daniels, cinematographer
Mac Danzig, mixed martial artist
Khashyar Darvich, documentary filmmaker
Harry L. Davis, mayor, governor
Ruby Dee, actress
Donald DeFreeze, leader of Symbionese Liberation Army
Ed Delahanty, baseball player
Cheri Dennis, singer
Dominic Dieter, radio personality
Tony Discenzo, football player
Charles Dolan, media mogul
Larry Dolan, owner of the Cleveland Indians
Patty Donahue, singer
Phil Donahue, television personality
Stephen R. Donaldson, novelist
Conya Doss, singer
Mike Douglas, singer and television personality
Herbert H. Dow, industrialist, Dow Chemical founder
Sharon Draper, educator
Stan Drayton, football coach
Keir Dullea, actor (2001: A Space Odyssey)
Jerry Dybzinski, baseball player

E
Mike Easler, baseball player
Dennis E. Eckart politician
Geraldine Edwards, baseball player
Kevin Edwards, basketball player
Eric Ehrmann, journalist
Paul Eiding, voice actor
Judyann Elder, actress
Jayrone Elliott, football player
Harlan Ellison, author
John A. Ellsler, acting teacher
Joe Eszterhas, screenwriter
Lee Evans, football player
John C. Ewers, ethnologist

F
Sean Faris, actor
William Feather, publisher and author
Ed Feighan, politician
Bob Feller, Hall of Fame baseball pitcher
Dick Feagler, newspaper columnist, playwright and TV personality
Frederick Fennell, conductor
Cristina Ferrare, TV personality
George Fett, cartoonist
Bobby Few, musician
Rich Fields, meteorologist
Antwone Fisher, writer
London Fletcher, football player
Miriam Flynn, actress
Quinton Flynn, voice actor
Dezső Földes (1880–1950), Hungarian-born two-time Olympic champion saber fencer
William Perry Fogg, author and adventurer
George L. Forbes, president of Cleveland City Council, 1974–1989
Dave Ford, baseball player
Mark Foster, singer with Foster the People
Alan Freed, radio personality
Jonathan Freeman, Broadway and voice actor 
Siaara Freeman, poet and playwright 
 Benny Friedman (1905–1982), Hall of Fame NFL football quarterback
Dan Friedman, graphic designer
Dan Fritsche, hockey player
William Otto Frohring, biochemical researcher, inventor, and business executive
Dorothy Fuldheim, television journalist
Caroline Furness, astronomer

G
Neil Giraldo, singer
Denise Galik, actress
Michael X. Garrett, soldier
James A. Garfield, 20th President of the United States
Johnny Gargano, professional wrestler
Teri Garr, actress
Joe Gentile, author
Zelma George, opera singer and philanthropist 
Sonny Geraci, musician
Redmond Gerard, Olympic snowboarder 
Willie Gilbert, playwright
Ted Ginn Jr., football player
Ted Ginn Sr., Glenville High School football and basketball coach
Donald A. Glaser, Nobel Prize-winning physicist
Gary Glover, baseball player
Jim Glover, folk singer
Carlin Glynn, actress
Brad Goldberg, MLB baseball pitcher
Bob Golic, football player
Mike Golic, football player
Anthony Gonzalez, football player and politician
Jim Graner, sportscaster
Elvis Grbac, football player
Danny Greene, mobster
Norm Greeney, football player
Dorian Gregory, actor
Joel Grey, actor
Roger William Gries, bishop
Tom Griswold, radio personality
DeJuan Groce, football player
Gordon Gund, NBA and NHL team owner
Mark Gunn, football player
John Guzik, football player
Stephen Gyllenhaal, film director, writer, and producer

H
Kathryn Hahn, actress
Imani Hakim, actress
Arsenio Hall, television personality
Roy Hall, football player
Charles Hamilton, rapper
Margaret Hamilton, actress, the Wicked Witch of the West in The Wizard of Oz
Anthony Hancock, football player
Greg Harbaugh, astronaut
Bill Hardman, musician
Dorothy Hart, actress
Kevin Hart, baseball player
Steve Harvey, comedian, actor
Mickey Hatcher, baseball player and coach
Jeff Hatrix, musician
Screamin' Jay Hawkins, singer
Geoffrey C. Hazard Jr., law professor
John Hay, statesman
Patricia Heaton, actress
Anne Heche, actress
John Heisman, football coach
Jerry Heller, music manager
John Henton, actor
Kim Herring, football player
John Hicks
Dave Hill, comedian
Naz Hillmon, WNBA player
Jermale Hines, NFL player
Wilson Hirschfeld, journalist
Alphonso Hodge, football player
Hal Holbrook, actor
Brian Holzinger, hockey player
Jessica Holmes, news anchor
Bob Hope, iconic comedian and actor
William R. Hopkins, politician, airport namesake
Desmond Howard, football player
Terrence Howard, actor
Stephanie Howse, politician
Andy Hrovat, college and Olympic wrestler
Benjamin Watson Hubbard, politician
Adella Prentiss Hughes, orchestra patron
Langston Hughes, poet and playwright
Jane Edna Hunter, social worker
Ross Hunter, film producer
Michael Hutter, pro wrestler
Diana Hyland, actress

I
Mary Bigelow Ingham, educator, writer, social reformer
Darrell Issa, Republican U.S. Representative of California's 49th congressional district

J
Frank G. Jackson, former mayor of Cleveland
Tom Jackson, football player, ESPN sportscaster
Jeff Johnson
Larry Johnson, baseball player
Philip Johnson, architect
Cardale Jones, football player
Dre'Mont Jones, football player
Rajiv Joseph, Pulitzer Prize-nominated playwright of Bengal Tiger at the Baghdad Zoo
Joe Jurevicius, football player

K
Sean Kanan, actor
Carol Kane, actress
Roberta A. Kaplan, lawyer
Sidney Katz, physician
Sammy Kaye, bandleader
Roger A. Keats, businessman and politician
Jason Kelce, football player
Travis Kelce, football player
Clark Kellogg, basketball player, sportscaster
Machine Gun Kelly, rapper
Jayne Kennedy, television personality
Kid Cudi, hip-hop artist
Mary Jo Kilroy, politician
King Chip, hip-hop artist
Don King, boxing promoter
Fred Kohler, chief of police, mayor
Boris Kolker, language translator
Richard J. Kramer, CEO of Goodyear Tire and Rubber Company
Valdis Krebs, author
Dennis Kucinich, politician

L
Marshon Lattimore, NFL player
Dale Launer, screenwriter
Peter Laughner, musician, Rocket from the Tombs, Pere Ubu
Frank Lausche, Cleveland mayor, Ohio governor and senator
Jantel Lavender, basketball player
Jerry Lawler, wrestler and commentator
Jerome Lawrence, playwright
Hal Lebovitz, sportswriter
Mike Lebowitz, attorney
Nicole Marie Lenz, actress
Al Lerner, pianist, composer
Gerald Levert, singer
Sean Levert, singer
D. A. Levy, poet
Matthew N. Levy, physiologist
 Fannie Lewis, Cleveland's longest serving female council member
Jazsmin Lewis, actress
Peter B. Lewis, businessman
David Lighty, basketball player
Dwight Little, film director
Frank Lockhart, auto racer, Indy 500 champion
Steve Logan, basketball player
Joe Lovano, saxophonist
Jim Lovell, astronaut
G. David Low, astronaut
Chris Lozano, mixed martial arts fighter

M

James S. Mace, politician 
Michael Malatin, businessman
Steve Malovic (1956–2007), American-Israeli basketball player
Henry Mancini, Oscar and Grammy Award-winning composer
Madeline Manning, track and field Olympic gold medalist
Flora Stone Mather, philanthropist
Samuel Mather, philanthropist, industrialist
Diane McBain, actress
Liz McComb, singer
Michael McElroy, actor
Tim McGee, football player
Tommy Mercer, professional wrestler
Burgess Meredith, actor (Rocky, Grumpy Old Men, Batman)
Biagio Messina, TV producer, filmmaker, actor
Howard Metzenbaum, former State Representative and U.S. Senator
Bill Mitchell, automotive designer
Nick Mileti, sports mogul
Tim Misny, lawyer
The Miz, pro wrestler
Antwaun Molden, football player
Isabela Moner, singer and actress
Richard Montanari
Toccara Montgomery, Olympic wrestler
Fred Moore (tomb sentinel), first African American tomb guard for the Tomb of the Unknown Soldier (Arlington)   Moore's achievement broke one of the US Army’s most historic color lines. 
Rudy Ray Moore, actor
Anthony Morgan, football player
Daniel E. Morgan, politician
Garrett Morgan, inventor of the Safety Hood
William Alexander Morgan, former soldier who moved to Cuba to help the Cuban Revolution 
Lorin Morgan-Richards, author and illustrator, primarily of children's books.
Tom Moriarty, football player
Greg Morris, actor
Toni Morrison (1931–2019), Pulitzer Prize-winning novelist
Albert Reynolds Morse, businessman and philanthropist
Bob Mrosko, football player
Scott Mruczkowski, football player

N
Tom Nagel, actor, film director, and producer
Fred Neil, folk singer, songwriter, and dolphin preservationist
Paul Newman, Oscar-winning actor, director, auto racer, philanthropist
Jonathan Newsome, NFL player
Kenneth Nichols, civil engineer and contributor to the Manhattan Project
Chuck Noll, coach of Super Bowl champion Pittsburgh Steelers
Andre Norton, science-fiction writer

O
Charles Oakley, basketball player
John O'Brien, author
Kelly O'Donnell, television journalist
Terrence O'Donnell, judge
Ron O'Neal, actor
Susan Orlean, journalist and author
Benjamin Orr, musician, The Cars
Jesse Owens, iconic athlete, Olympic champion
Walter Owens, Negro league baseball player
Mehmet Oz, doctor, television personality

P
Lawanda Page, actress
Paul Palnik, artist
Sam Palumbo, football player
Paula Jai Parker, actress
Marc Parnell, author and ornithologist
Rod Parsley, televangelist
Robert Patrick, actor
Gary Patterson, football coach
Ruben Patterson, basketball player
Virginia Patton, actress
Jake Paul, internet celebrity
Logan Paul, internet celebrity
Henry B. Payne, politician
Roger Peckinpaugh, baseball player
Harvey Pekar, comic book creator
Roger Penske, auto racing
Sarah Maria Clinton Perkins (1824-1905), minister, social reformer, editor, author 
Charles B. Perry,  lawyer, politician
Dav Pilkey, children's book author
Terry Pluto, sportswriter
Frank Pokorny, former member of the Ohio House of Representatives of the U.S. state of Ohio
Michael Polensek, member of the Cleveland City Council
John Popper, musician
Jason Popson, singer
James Posey, basketball player
Joe Posnanski, sportswriter
Monica Potter, actress
Beverly Potts, schoolgirl who famously disappeared in 1951
Joe Prokop, football player
 Henry Prusoff (1912–1943), tennis player
Bob Ptacek, football player

R
Stanley Radwan, strongman and professional wrestler
Doria Ragland, mother of Meghan, Duchess of Sussex
Raz-B, real name DeMario Thornton, singer
Devine Redding, football player
Marge Redmond, actress
Lili Reinhart, actress
Jack Reynolds, broadcaster and professional wrestling announcer
Trent Reznor, singer-songwriter
James Ford Rhodes, industrialist and historian
Florence Rice, actress
Bill Rieth, football player
Eric Riley, basketball player
Jack Riley, actor
James Riordan,actor
Barbara Roads, labor activist and flight attendant
Bumper Robinson, actor
John D. Rockefeller Jr., American financer, philanthropist, son of Standard Oil co-founder John D. Rockefeller 
Wilbur M. Root, Wisconsin politician
Terry Rozier, basketball player
Alan Ruck, actor
Michael Ruhlman, author
Rudolph Rummel, political scientist
Michael Rupp, hockey player
Alex Russo, actress
Anthony Russo, film director
Joe Russo, director
Steve Ruzich, football player
Joe Ryan, Alaska politician

S
JaKarr Sampson, pro basketball player
Steve Sanders, former professional football player 
Perry Saturn, pro wrestler
Ollie Savatsky, football player
Scott Savol, singer, American Idol
Scott Ramon Seguro Mescudi, rapper, singer, songwriter, record producer, and actor
Moe Savransky (born 1929), Major League Baseball pitcher
Tom Schoen, football player
Xen C. Scott, football player, football, baseball, and basketball coach, and sportswriter
Ron Sega, astronaut, Air Force major-general
Ed Seward, 19th-century baseball player
Michael Shane, lawyer, actor
Molly Shannon, comedian and actress
Bonnie Shemie, author and illustrator
André Shepherd, United States Army Specialist who applied for asylum in Germany after deserting his unit
Dwight Shepherd, United States Navy officer and career Naval Flight Officer
Sam Sheppard, physician, convicted murderer
Henry Sherwin, co-founder of Sherwin-Williams paint
Cecil Shorts, football player
Phillip Shriver, historian, former college administrator, and former president of Miami University
Don Shula, Hall of Fame football coach
Joe Shuster, co-creator of Superman
Larry Shyatt, basketball coach
Jerry Siegel, co-creator of Superman
Ruth Simpson, lesbian activist, author
Eric Singer, musician, Kiss
Matija Škerbec, priest
Barbara Smith, activist
Beverly Smith, activist
Chuck Smith, baseball player and current mayor of Woodmere, Ohio, a Cleveland suburb
Martha Smith, actress, Animal House
Patricia Haynes Smith, member of the Louisiana House of Representatives
Troy Smith, football player
Frank Solich, football player and current head coach for Ohio University
Ray Solomonoff, founder of artificial intelligence
Charles Somers, coal and baseball exec
Kath Soucie, voice actress
Tris Speaker, Hall of Fame baseball player
Nancy Spero, artist
Frank Stalletto, pro wrestler
Michael Stanley, singer-songwriter
George Steinbrenner III, owner of the New York Yankees
Brian Stepanek, actor
Lucy Stanton, abolitionist
Tom Stincic, football player
Carl B. Stokes, first African American mayor of a major US city, mayor of Cleveland 1968–71
Louis Stokes, 15-term U.S. Representative to Congress
Amasa Stone, philanthropist, railroad magnate, bridge builder
Robert D. Storey, philanthropist, university trustee, corporate director
Rich Stotter, football player
Vernon Stouffer, founder of Stouffer's foods and restaurants; Cleveland Indians owner
Brad Stuver, professional soccer player
Ed Sustersic, football player
Michael Symon, chef, restaurateur, TV personality

T
James Terry (born 1960), American-Israeli basketball player
Josh Robert Thompson, actor, voice actor, and impressionist 
John Patrick Treacy, Roman Catholic bishop of the Diocese of La Crosse
Jack Trice, football player; first African-American athlete at Iowa State College (now Iowa State University); Jack Trice Stadium is currently the only Division 1 stadium or arena to be named after an African-American
Joseph Trohman, musician, Fall Out Boy
 Demetrius Treadwell, basketball player
Hal Trosky Jr., baseball player
Stephanie Tubbs Jones, politician
Barbara Turner, former WNBA basketball player who currently is an assistant coach for the Atlanta Dream
Julia Tuttle, businesswoman, the "mother of Miami"

U
Loung Ung, author; speaker; Khmer Rouge survivor; activist against landmines

V
Sander Vanocur (1928–2019), television journalist
Dirk Verbeuren, Belgian-born musician
Kate Voegele, singer-songwriter
George Voinovich, mayor of Cleveland 1980–89; governor of Ohio 1991–98; U.S. Senator 1999–2011
Joe Vosmik, baseball player

W
Stephen Waldschmidt, playwright, actor
Neal Walk (1948–2015), basketball player
Joe Walsh, musician, The Eagles
Carl Walz, astronaut
Larry Wanke, football player
Denzel Ward, NFL cornerback with the Cleveland Browns
Robert Ward, composer
Josephine Turpin Washington (1861–1949), educator and writer
Ted Wass, actor
Lew Wasserman, entertainment agent
Bill Watterson, artist, author of Calvin and Hobbes
Sharon Waxman (born c.1963), journalist
Mary Ellen Weber, astronaut
Scott Weiland, musician, Stone Temple Pilots
Tom Weiskopf, golfer
 Jayson Wells (born 1976), basketball player
Bill Wertz, baseball player
Roland West, film director
Jack Weston, actor
Michael R. White, mayor of Cleveland 1990–2002
Kym Whitley, actress
Donte Whitner, football player
Eric Wilkerson, football player
Archibald Willard, painter
Fred Willard, actor
Aaron Williams, boxer
Doc Williams, singer
Jawad Williams, basketball player
Debra Winger, actress
Alexander Winton, Scottish-born auto racer
Lindsey Witten NFL player
Bobby Womack, singer
Cecil Womack, singer
Mike Woods, football player
Pierre Woods, football player
Evan Wright, writer
Frank Wright, jazz musician
Shane Wynn, NFL player

X
Clyde X, leader in the Nation of Islam

Y
Frank Yankovic, musician, polka king
Barrie Youngfellow, actress
 Sean Young, actress

Z
Ray Zeh, football player
Joe Zelenka, football player
Dolph Ziggler, pro wrestler

Groups
all five members of rap group Bone Thugs-N-Harmony
all six members of Chimaira, heavy metal band
all eleven members of Dazz Band, funk band
James Gang
The Moonglows
Mushroomhead, heavy metal band
Nine Inch Nails
Old Grandma Hardcore (Barbara St. Hilaire)
The Outsiders, 1960s band: smash hit "Time Won't Let Me"
Pere Ubu, experimental rock group
The Poni-Tails, girl group noted for their 1958 hit "Born Too Late"
Raspberries, 1970s band; smash hit "Go All the Way"
The Secrets, girl group noted for their 1963 hit "The Boy Next Door"

See also
List of politicians from Cleveland
List of people from Ohio

References

	

 
People
Cleveland
Cleveland